This is a list of Italian football transfers for the 2010–11 season. Only moves from Serie A and Serie B are listed.

The summer transfer window ran from 1 July 2010, the end of the 2009–10 season, with a few transfers taking place prior to the season's complete end. The window closed on 31 August 19:00 (Milan Time). The mid-season transfer window opened on 3 January 2011, and ran for the entire month, until 31 January. Players without a club may join one, either during or in between transfer windows.

On 2 July 2010, FIGC announced only one new non-EU signing from abroad could be registered, instead of two in previous season; they were marked yellow. Juventus, which the team originally had two quota (Amauri and Martín Cáceres), now only had one.

Summer transfer window

Notes
 Player officially joined his new club on 1 July 2010.

Summer transfer window (August)

See also
List of Italian football transfers summer 2010 (co-ownership)

References
General
 
 
 
Specific

External links

Italy
Trans
2010